Can You Hear Me? is the second Japanese extended play by South Korean singer-songwriter IU. It was released on March 20, 2013.

Background and development
IU made her Japanese debut under EMI Music Japan in March 2012, with the single "Good Day." Since then, she had been active in both South Korea and Japan. In South Korea, she released the extended play Spring of a Twenty Year Old and collaborated with Korean girl group Fiestar for the song "Sea of Moonlight." In July, she released a Japanese version of her 2011 single "You & I," and held her first Japanese concert, IU Friendship Special Concert: Autumn2012, on September 17, 2012. Both of these were recorded at her first Japanese concert.

In support of the French musical, Notre-Dame de Paris performed at the Tokyu Theatre Orb in Shibuya in February and March, IU covered a song from the English version of the musical, "The Age of the Cathedrals." This was released as a cellphone download on February 6, 2013, and later as a PC download on February 13. This rendition was added to Can You Hear Me? as a bonus track.

The album was officially announced on January 25, 2013.

Writing and production
The album was mostly recorded at DCH Studio, Tokyo, and Loen Studio in Seoul. Additional instrumental recording was recorded at Flyte Tyme Studios in Santa Monica, California and Jackson's Lyric Studio in Birmingham, Alabama. An orchestral sequence in the song "Beautiful Dancer" was performed by the China National Symphony Orchestra, which was recorded at Middle Chorus Studio in Beijing.

The extended play features IU's first original Japanese songs. American R&B production team Jimmy Jam and Terry Lewis were enlisted to write two songs for the project, "Beautiful Dancer" and "Truth." "Beautiful Dancer" was the first time for IU to sing an R&B song. Hiro of the Japanese hip-hop unit LGYankees also served as a vocal producer for the album, and wrote lyrics to three songs on the album.

The song "Voice-mail" was written and composed by IU, then translated into Japanese. This is the fourth self-penned song by IU, after "Take My Hand" from The Greatest Love soundtrack (2011), "A Stray Puppy" from Last Fantasy (2011) and "Peach" (2012). IU composed the song on her acoustic guitar, and completed it in two to three hours.

The Korean version of the song was later put onto IU's third Korean-language studio album Modern Times as a bonus track.

Promotion and release
"Beautiful Dancer" was chosen as the leading promoted track from the extended play and released to radio. It was used as the March ending theme song for the Nippon TV music show Happy Music. The music video was released on March 8, 2013, and was shot over two days in Thailand. A week after the album on March 27, 2013, IU held her first fan meeting event, IU: The First Fan Meeting in Japan at the Tokyo International Forum. IU was featured in magazines to promote the album, was as Haruhana, CanCam, Soup, Rolling Stone Japan and Mini.

"The Age of the Cathedrals" and "New World" were released as promotional singles as album previews in Japan digital outlet, which were released digitally on February 6, 2013 and February 20, 2013.

Chart reception
The album debuted at number 23 on Oricon's albums chart, selling 6,000 copies. After charting for three weeks in the top 300 albums, the extended play sold a total of 8,000 copies. This was less than her previous Japanese extended play, I□U, a compilation album of Korean songs released before her debut in 2011, and significantly less than her two Japanese singles, "Good Day" and "You & I," which were both top 10 releases.

"New World" reached a peak of 76 on the Billboard Japan Hot 100, and the lead single "Beautiful Dancer" reached number 66.

Track listing

Chart rankings

Sales and certifications

Personnel
Personnel details were sourced from Can You Hear Me?s liner notes booklet.ManagerialSoo-Hyun An – marketing for Loen
Jong-Han Bae – artist management for Loen
Chan Nam-Kung – management director for Loen
Young-Chul Cho – production
Seung-Min Choi – assistant management for Loen
Tom Coyne – mastering
Sung-Wook Chung – performance director for Loen
Yuki Funakoshi – contractor, sound coordination (Digz, Inc.), production direction (#3, #5)
Hyun-Jin Jang – marketing director for Loen
Han-Teo Jeong – assistant management for Loen
Hee-Yeon Jeong – marketing for Loen
Seong-Kwan Jeong – co-production, planning director for Loen
Choon-Ho Jo – artist management for Loen
Gae-Won Jo – assistant management for Loen
Woo-Kyung Jung – assistant management for Loen
Shuzo Kamide – marketing for EMI
Chang-Soo Kim – A&R
Hyo-Shin Kim – planning for Loen
Jin-Myoung Kim – A&R director
Jung-Min Kim – A&R
Sung-Kyung Kim – marketing for Loen
Young-Seok Kim – executive supervisor for Loen
Kazuhiko Koike – executive producer for EMI

Yoshiaki Kudo – contractor, sound coordination (Digz, Inc.)
Dong-Jin Kwon – performance arrangement for Loen
Chang-Hee Lee – assistant management for Loen
Jung-Min Lee – administration support for Loen
Sung-Woo Lee – A&R
Young-Soo Lim – executive supervisor for Loen
Michael T. Martin – contractor, sound coordination (UnderCover Inc.)
Shinya Nagai – management for EMI
Hidenobu Okira – A&R director, production
Junh-Hyun Park – assistant management for Loen
Si-Won Park – marketing for Loen
Yo-Han Park – performance arrangement for Loen
Yonh-Hoon Seo – A&R
Ryoichi Shimizu – sales promotion for EMI
Won-Soo Shin – executive producer for Loen
Yasuhiro Takeuchi – sales promotion for EMI
Naoshi Yamaguchi – management for EMI
Yoshifumi Yamaminami – sales promotion for EMI
Kwonsang Yang – management for EMI, Port One
Sang-Jae Yoo – marketing for Loen
Dong-Hwan Youn – performance arrangement for Loen
Won-Kyu Yun – A&RPerformance creditsChina National Symphony Orchestra – orchestra (#1)
IU – vocals
John Jackson – all instruments (#2)
Jimmy Jam – all instruments (#1)
Jong-Min Lee – guitar (#4)

Soon-Yong Lee – bass (#4)
Mitsu.J – all instruments (#6)
Ali Thomson – all instruments (#5)
Christoffer Wikberg – all instruments (#5)Visuals and imageryHiroshi Kitta – design
Misato Kowaki – stylist, visuals producer
Shin-Ae Lee – make-up
Joo-Hee No – stylist assistant

Tomoya Takano – photography
Shinnosuke Yamada – hair and make-up supervisor
Yoon-Seo – hairTechnical and production'

Richard Brown – assisting (#1)
G-Gorilla – arrangement (#4)
Gregory Germain – mixing (#6), vocal recording (#1—3, #5)
IU – arrangement (#4)
Masashi Hashimono – orchestra recording (#1)
Hiro for Digz, inc. – vocal production (#1—3)
Huang Li Jie – concert master (#1)
Seuah Hwang – "Beautiful Dancer" music video director
Tomoo Ichimura – DVD producer
John Jackson – co-production (#1), production (#2), recording (#2)
Jimmy Jam and Terry Lewis – production (#1—2), recording (#1)
Matt Marrin – mixing (#1—2)

Atsushi Matsui – DVD recording, mixing
Mitsu.J – arrangement (#6)
Masaru Nishiyama – conductor, orchestra arrangement (#1)
Brian Paturalski – mixing (#3)
Q-TEC – DVD authoring
Andros Rodriguez – mixing (#5)
Myung-Kab Son – mixing (#4), recording (#4, #6)
Tak – DVD director
Atsushi Takahata – DVD producer
Ali Thomson – production (#5)
Christoffer Wikberg – production (#5)
Yadako – vocal production (#5)

Release history

References

2013 EPs
IU (singer) EPs
Japanese-language EPs